A border guard of a country is a national security agency that performs border security.

Border Guard may also refer to:

Border Guard (Finland)
Bundesgrenzschutz, Germany
Border Guard (Poland)
Border Guard Corps, Switzerland

See also
 Border Patrol (disambiguation)
 Border Troops (disambiguation)